Marzia Caravelli (born 23 October 1981 in Pordenone) is an Italian hurdler.

Biography
She was 3rd at the 2011 European Team Championships in Stockholm. Her 100 metres hurdles personal best is 12"85 set in Montgeron on 13 May 2012.

In 2005 Marzia Caravelli made her debut for the Italian national team, but she was a late developer in sporting terms and begun to get good results at international level in 2010 at the age of 29. Despite reaching the semi-finals at the 2012 Summer Olympics in London, she has not succeeded in convincing the national federation to allow her to become a member of one of the Italian military sports bodies.

Progression
100 metres hurdles

Achievements

National titles
She has won 7 times the individual national championship.
1 win in the 60 metres hurdles indoor (2010)
4 wins in the 100 metres hurdles (2010, 2011, 2012, 2013)
2 wins in the 200 metres  (2011, 2013)

See also
 Italian all-time lists - 100 metres hurdles
 Italian all-time lists - 4x100 metres relay

References

External links
 

1981 births
Living people
Italian female hurdlers
Italian female sprinters
Athletes (track and field) at the 2012 Summer Olympics
Athletes (track and field) at the 2016 Summer Olympics
Olympic athletes of Italy
Mediterranean Games gold medalists for Italy
Athletes (track and field) at the 2013 Mediterranean Games
World Athletics Championships athletes for Italy
Mediterranean Games medalists in athletics
People from Pordenone
Sportspeople from Friuli-Venezia Giulia
20th-century Italian women
21st-century Italian women